Starzlach may refer to rivers in Bavaria, Germany:

Starzlach (Breitach), tributary of the Breitach
Starzlach (Ostrach), tributary of the Ostrach
Starzlach (Wertach), tributary of the Wertach